The 2nd JOOX Thailand Music Awards was an awarding ceremony presented by JOOX Thailand, giving recognition to the Thai entertainment industry in the field of music for their achievements in the year 2017. Only the nominees in the main categories were voted upon by fans through the JOOX app. Voting period started on 9 February 2018 and ended on 28 February 2018.

The awards night was held at the KBank Siam Pic-Ganesha, Siam Square One, Bangkok, Thailand on Wednesday, 21 March 2018 and broadcast through the JOOX app.

Awards 
Nominations were announced on 22 February 2018. Winners are listed first and highlighted in bold:

Main

Special

Multiple nominations and awards

References 

2018
Joox